Daniel Sserunkuma aka Muzenyi (born 14 December 1993 in Kampala) is a Ugandan footballer who currently plays as a striker for Vipers SC and the Uganda national team (the "Cranes").

Early life
Sserunkuma was born and grew up in the Lubaga division of Kampala district. He attended St. Mary's School in Kitende which has also produced Ugandan players such as David Obua, Eric Obua, Emmanuel Okwi and Ibrahim Juma.

He joined Friends of Football Academy in Uganda at the age of 10. Sserunkuma said he was inspired by Ugandan legend, the late Majid Musisi, who is regarded as the country's best footballer of all time.

Club career

Express
Sserunkuma started playing professional football at Ugandan team Express F.C. in 2008.

Victors
After one year in Express F.C., he moved to rival club Victors FC, where he stayed for the next two years.

Nairobi City Stars
In 2011, Sserunkuma moved to Kenya to join Premier League team Nairobi City Stars.

Gor Mahia
After playing for a year and half for Nairobi City Stars, Sserunkuma then moved to Gor Mahia F.C. in 2012.

In 2013, Sserunkuma played an important role in helping Gor Mahia F.C. clinch the Kenyan Premier League title for the first time since 18 years. He ended the 2012 season with 17 goals and several assists and was named the 2012 KPL player of the year. As Gor Mahia sought to win the national league for the first time in 18 years, it was Sserunkuma who played the pivotal role by scoring in almost all the last 10 games of the 2013 league. Thanks largely to Sserunkuma's goalscoring heroics, Gor Mahia won the league.

In November 2013, Sserunkuma caused a stir in the club by officially handing in a transfer request, expressing his desire to join Armenian Premier League club FC Banants. However, the player was not allowed to leave the club.

In 2014, he was the highest goal scorer in the 2014 Kenyan Premier League season with total of 16 goals scored.

Simba S.C.
In December 2014, Sserunkuma completed a free transfer to Tanzanian giants Simba. He terminated his contract with the club on mutual consent after just five months in the Tanzanian Premier League.

Ulisses
On 30 July 2015, it was announced that Sserunkuma joined Armenian side Ulisses on a two-year contract.

Express
In September 2017, Dan joined Express.
Dan scored his first goal for Express against Maroons Football Club on 27 September 2017

Vipers S.C.
In January 2018, he joined Vipers SC where they formed fierce front three with Milton Karisa and Erisa Ssekisambu ending up winning the league. He also won the boot with 18goals.
2018/2019
Sserunkuma helped Vipers SC to finish second in the league scoring 13 goals in 21 matches in the absence of Karisa and Ssekisambu who were sold in the transfer window.
2019/2020
In this season Sserunkuma saw game time reduced when the club signed Fahad Bayo. He went on to score crucial goals and the team claimed the fourth League in their history.

International career
In February 2013, Sserunkuma received his first national team call up for the Ugandan Cranes. During his debut match against Rwanda, he scored one goal from the penalty spot while setting up the other.

International goals
Scores and results list Uganda's goal tally first.

Playing style
Sserunkuma's physical stature and style of play has been compared to that of Italian legend Gianfranco Zola. His greatest assets are his speed, skills, creative play, powerful shots and great balance.

Uganda national team head coach Milutin Sredojević praised Sserunkuma, referring to him as one of the best strikers in the region.

Honours
Gor Mahia
Kenyan Premier League: 2013, 2014

FKL President's Cup  Cup: 2012

Kenyan Super Cup: 2013

KPL Top 8 Cup: 2012
Simba
Tanzanian Premier League: 2015
Bandari
Kenyan Super Cup: 2016
Vipers
Uganda Premier League: 2017–2018, 2019–2020

Super 8: 2019
Individual
Uganda Premier League Top scorer: 2017–2018
New Player of the year in Kenya Premier League: 2011
Player of the year in Kenya Premier League: 2012
USPA Player of the year : 2013 
Topscorer in Kenya Premier League : 2014

Notes

References

External links
 
 
 

Living people
1993 births
Sportspeople from Kampala
Association football forwards
Ugandan footballers
Uganda international footballers
Uganda under-20 international footballers
Uganda youth international footballers
Ugandan expatriate footballers
Expatriate footballers in Kenya
Expatriate footballers in Armenia
Express FC players
Gor Mahia F.C. players
Simba S.C. players
Ulisses FC players
Kenyan Premier League players
Armenian Premier League players
Nairobi City Stars players
Bandari F.C. (Kenya) players
Ugandan expatriate sportspeople in Kenya
Ugandan expatriate sportspeople in Armenia
Expatriate footballers in Tanzania